Nathaniel Richards is a fictional time-traveling scientist appearing in American comic books published by Marvel Comics. He is the father of superhero Reed Richards, a founding member — and the leader of — the Fantastic Four. He is the namesake of his descendant, the futuristic villain known as Kang the Conqueror; unlike his descendant, the original Nathaniel is more of an adventurer who has a genuine love for his son.

Publication history
Nathaniel Richards first appeared in The Fantastic Four #272 (November 1984) and was created by writer-artist John Byrne.

Fictional character biography
Dr. Nathaniel Richards was a successful scientist who specialized in multiple fields. He was married to Evelyn and together had a son named Reed who possessed an intellectual mind like his father. When Evelyn died, Nathaniel continued to raise his son by supporting his scientific endeavors. Later, Nathaniel is approached by the Brotherhood of the Shield and joins their group. Along with Howard Stark, the two meet a super powered individual named Leonid and help him resolve a dispute between the time traveling Leonardo da Vinci and Isaac Newton who had split the organization in two. These events somehow resulted in Nathaniel gaining the ability to travel through time.

Nathaniel found himself in the far future along with several other alternate versions of himself. The villain Immortus had gathered them together and forced them to kill each other off. Nathaniel fled. To protect Reed, Nathaniel provided for his future and then disappeared from his life.

Nathaniel ended up in another dimension where the Earth had become a desolate wasteland when the moon was destroyed. He married a woman named Cassandra who bore two children for him, one of which grew up to be Huntara. Cassandra turned out to be a power-mad individual who used Nathaniel's technology to rule the remaining humans. The Fantastic Four and Wyatt Wingfoot arrived in this dimension, defeated Cassandra and freed Nathaniel. After father and son had a heartfelt reunion, Nathaniel stayed behind to help rebuild.

However, Nathaniel arrived in the present to kidnap Franklin Richards. Nathaniel aged Franklin to a teenager in an effort to prevent Franklin from having a child with Rachel Summers. Their child would eventually grow up to become the villain Hyperstorm. Nathaniel would help Franklin and the Fantastic Four battle Aron the Rogue Watcher by rescuing Uatu the Watcher.

Nathaniel later trained Susan Storm to better master her powers. 

Nathaniel returned to help Reed jumpstart the Future Foundation, using the technology he gathered over the years. He then helped them battle the Kree Army and the Mad Celestials.

Powers and abilities
Nathaniel Richards has no superpowers, but he is a scientific genius and skilled inventor in advanced technology. He invented a device called the Time Platform, which allows him to travel through time. The armor that he built on his own granted him increased strength, physical resistance, and access to various gadgets, as well as energy weapons for defense.

Other versions

What If?
 In "What if the Fantastic Four were Cosmonauts?", Nathaniel named his son Rudion and was interned in a Siberian camp after America lost faith in the USSR.
 In another reality based on Camelot, Nathaniel Richards is a variation of Merlin to a version of Black Knight.

The Beast
A version of Nathaniel Richards pulled into the far future with the other Nathaniels by Immortus, called the Beast, was a homicidal maniac who took the opportunity to slaughter all of his counterparts. The Nathaniel of Earth-616 teams up with young college-age Reed Richards, Ben Grimm and Victor von Doom in order to defeat him.

Ultimate Marvel
In the Ultimate Marvel Universe, Reed's father is renamed Gary Richards and he does not have a scientific background. He also seems to despise his son's scientific mind, preferring his friend Ben Grimm's athletic abilities. When the Baxter Building think tank accepted Reed, Gary was glad that he was gone. When Diablo kidnapped Reed's younger sister Enid, Gary went to Reed for help though he still resented him. When Reed quit the Fantastic Four, Gary was there to greet him, not acting surprised. Gary, along with his wife Mary and two daughters, were killed in an explosion directed at the Richards household, later revealed to have been perpetrated by Reed himself, now the supervillainous Maker.

In other media
Reed's father, simply credited as Mr. Richards, appears in 2015's Fantastic Four played by Tim Heidecker. He is apparently not Reed's biological father and spends most of his time watching football on television. Several of Mr. Richards' scenes were cut.

See also
 Kang the Conqueror
 Immortus
 Iron Lad

References

External links
 Nathaniel Richards at Marvel.com

Characters created by John Byrne (comics)
Comics characters introduced in 1984
Fantastic Four characters
Fictional characters with superhuman durability or invulnerability
Fictional child abusers
Fictional kidnappers
Fictional inventors
Marvel Comics characters who can teleport
Marvel Comics characters with superhuman strength
Marvel Comics film characters
Marvel Comics male supervillains
Marvel Comics scientists
Marvel Comics supervillains
Time travelers